Bella Nagy (July 4, 1879 – January 30, 1947), born Bella Grósz, was a Hungarian actress, and second wife of writer Mór Jókai.

Early life 
Bella Grósz was born in Jákó, Hungary, the daughter of Móric Grósz and Éva Flamm. Her family was Jewish; her father was a mechanic. She graduated from a commercial school in Óbuda before pursuing an interest in the theatre, attending the Rákosi Szidi acting school.

Career 
Nagy had her stage debut in 1898, and performed in several works by Mór Jókai before she married the writer in 1899 in Budapest. Their 54-year age difference (he was 74, and she was 20), plus their religious differences, caused a scandal, and his family tried to have him declared incompetent. She left the stage reluctantly, and attempted a comeback in 1901, but continued in the public eye as Jókai's wife. After his death, she was his sole heir, outraging other claimants and causing further scandal and prolonged legal battles; she lost those battles, and was left without support from Jókai's estate.

In 1912, Nagy donated Jókai's books and papers to the Hungarian National Museum in exchange for a life pension.

Personal life 
Nagy married writer Mór Jókai in 1899, as his second wife; they honeymooned in Sicily. His first wife, Róza Laborfalvi, was also an actress. Nagy was widowed when Jókai died in 1904; she never remarried. She moved to England in the 1939, to flee the Nazis and to arrange for an English-language edition of her husband's works. She lost her life pension in 1942, when Germany pressured Hungary to cease payments. She died in 1947, in Amersham, Buckinghamshire, aged 67 years.

References 

1879 births
1947 deaths
Hungarian actresses
Hungarian Jews
Hungarian emigrants to the United States